Hu Mingxuan (born March 10, 1998) is a Chinese basketball player for the Guangdong Southern Tigers, and the national team. He plays the point guard position. He was included in the Chinese national team's squad for the 2019 FIBA Basketball World Cup.

In the 2020–21 Chinese Basketball Association season, Hu Mingxuan became the Most Valuable Player of the Finals.

In October 2021, Hu secured a comeback 111-108 victory for his Guangdong Southern Tigers against Sichuan Blue Whales by scoring a career-high 36 points. He shot 11 out of 28 in 29 minutes. Hu made all four free throws from a double-foul call and a back-court foul to pocket the victory.

References

Living people
1998 births
Chinese men's basketball players
People from Ürümqi
Point guards